Leonard Richmond (1889-1965) was a Somerset born British watercolour landscape artist who spent a large part of his career in Canada ansd was noted for his railway posters.

Biography
During World War I Richmond served as an official war artist for Canada. In the 1920s and 1930s he produced posters promoting the Canadian Pacific Railway plus the Southern and Great Western Railways in Britain. Richmond was awarded several prizes including the Tuthill Prize (1928) at the Chicago International Watercolour Exhibition and a silver medal (1947) at the Paris Salon. Examples of his pictures are held by several public collections in Britain including: The British Museum; All Souls College, Oxford; the National Railway Museum; The National Trust (Cliveden); Newport Museum and Art Gallery; and Penlee House Gallery and Museum.

Selected publications
 Richmond, L. (1969). The technique of oil painting. London: Pitman.
 Richmond, L. (1966). From the sketch to the finished picture: Oil painting. London: Pitman.
 Richmond, L., Bell, V., Nash, P., Kauffer, E. M. K., & Friday Club (London, England). (1933). The technique of the poster. London: Sir Isaac Pittman & Sons Ltd.
 Richmond, L. (1966). The art of landscape painting. Pitman.

Gallery
Images of Richmonds work:

References

External links

1889 births
1965 deaths
20th-century English painters
20th-century English male artists
Artists from Somerset
British poster artists
British war artists
English male painters